Jamie McDonagh (born 8 May 1996) is a Northern Irish semi-professional footballer who plays as a winger or forward for Cliftonville.

Career

Greenock Morton
Jamie McDonagh signed for Greenock Morton in the summer of 2016 as a forward. Though throughout the 2016–17 campaign, McDonagh featured as a right midfielder and right back, due to injuries to Conor Pepper and Michael Doyle. McDonagh left Morton in May 2017 at the expiration of his contract.

After a short spell at Sligo Rovers, McDonagh joined Derry City in December 2017.

Glentoran
On 1 August 2020, Jamie signed for Irish Premiership side, Glentoran.

Honours
Alfreton Town
Derbyshire Senior Cup: 2015-16
Derry City
EA Sports Cup: 2018
Cliftonville
Irish League Cup: 2021-22

References

External links

1996 births
Living people
Greenock Morton F.C. players
Linfield F.C. players
Association football wingers
Association footballers from Northern Ireland
Portadown F.C. players
Sheffield United F.C. players
Scottish Professional Football League players
Association football forwards
Alfreton Town F.C. players
Chester F.C. players
Sligo Rovers F.C. players
Derry City F.C. players
Association footballers from Belfast
Matlock Town F.C. players
Northern Ireland youth international footballers
Northern Ireland under-21 international footballers
Sportspeople from Lisburn
Glentoran F.C. players
Cliftonville F.C. players